Stunt Silva is an Indian stunt actor, action director and stunt co-ordinator who has worked in Tamil, Telugu, Malayalam, Kannada, Marathi, Hindi and Sinhala films. He made his debut with the 2005 Telugu film Chatrapathi, directed by S. S. Rajamouli and has since also made appearances in films, portraying a supporting antagonist.

Career
After training as a nurse at Stanley Medical College, Silva began working as a male nurse at hospitals in his home town of Tuticorin before joining Vijaya Health Centre in Chennai in 1990. He also pursued work as a peon in offices and dabbled in a transport business to keep a float financially. In 2002, he met a dance choreographer from the film industry who advised him to sign up as a background dancer in films. He took up dance lessons at Paul Raj's school but was unable to gain access into the dancers' union and instead, as a means of making any sort of money, opted to apply for membership with the union for stuntmen. Silva then began working as an assistant to stunt choreographer Peter Hein in Run (2002) and Thirumalai (2003), and choose to leave his hospital ward boy duties. During his time as an assistant,  (2005) he helped  Rajinikanth perform stunts in Sivaji (2007).

After serving as an assistant fighter in several Tamil and Telugu films, director S. S. Rajamouli gave Silva an opportunity to work as the stunt director of his fantasy film Yamadonga (2007), for which his work won critical acclaim. He has since gone on to work in over one hundred Indian films as the lead stunt director, working with leading directors and actors. He won recognition for his chase sequences in Mankatha (2011) and has regularly collaborated in films directed by Venkat Prabhu. In 2014, he was described by Sify.com as having achieved a "career high" through his work on prestigious film projects.

Stunt Silva has also featured in films portraying a supporting antagonist. After being seen as a henchman in Yamadonga (2007), Thalaiva (2013), Jilla (2014) and Veeram (2014), he portrayed the role of a gangster in Gautham Menon's Yennai Arindhaal (2015). He was also revealed to be a playing a leading role in the sports film, Brazil, which began production in 2014.

Personal life
Stunt Silva was credited in films under his original name, Selvam, and also as Selva, before being mistakenly referred to as Silva in the credits of Vinnaithaandi Varuvaayaa (2010) by Gautham Vasudev Menon. He has subsequently chosen to adapt it as a stage name, noting that the industry's fixation with foreign stunt directors, meant that a foreign-sounding name would benefit him.

Awards and nominations

Filmography
Stunt director and actor

Director
Chithirai Sevvanam (2021) (released on Zee5)

References

External links

Living people
Date of birth missing (living people)
Male actors in Tamil cinema
Male actors from Chennai
Indian stunt performers
Film directors from Chennai
20th-century Indian male actors
21st-century Indian film directors
Male actors in Telugu cinema
Male actors in Malayalam cinema
Indian male film actors
Indian action choreographers
People from Thoothukudi district
1973 births